Cry Wolfe is an American television show created for Investigation Discovery.

Plot
Cry Wolfe uses actors to reenact some of private investigator Brian Wolfe's most interesting cases. His cases include cheating spouses, workplace theft, and blackmail. Wolfe is helped by his investigative assistant, Janine McCarthy.

Production
Wolfe was initially hired to work as a private investigator in several episodes of Nathan for You. After his appearance he was contacted by Karga Seven Pictures who were looking to do a show about an LA private investigator. Wolfe provides his case files to the production company who choose which cases they want to use.

Reception
Brian Lowry from Variety considered the show's presentation style to be deceptive and misleading, using shaky hand-held video and a "faux camera crew" to give the impression that the footage was not a reenactment. Others enjoyed the more "playful" take on the topic, in contrast to the other true crime shows on Investigation Discovery.

References

External links

Investigation Discovery original programming
2014 American television series debuts
2016 American television series endings
True crime television series